Fatehabad Assembly constituency is one of the 90 Legislative Assembly constituencies of Haryana state in India.

It is part of Fatehabad district.

Members of the Legislative Assembly

Election results

2019

Previous Results

See also
 List of constituencies of the Haryana Legislative Assembly
 Fatehabad district

References

Fatehabad district
Assembly constituencies of Haryana